Myron Demond Butler (born July 27, 1974) is a gospel musician, record producer, singer-songwriter, music director, vocalist, organist and pianist.  Most notably, he is known as the leader of the gospel choir, Myron Butler & Levi. Since 1997, he's worked as a vocal director and backup singer for several notable artists to include Kirk Franklin, Marvin Sapp, Smokie Norful, Donald Lawrence, and Yolanda Adams.

Biography
Butler was born as Myron Demond Butler, on July 27, 1974, just outside Tampa, Florida in the city of Bradenton, Florida, and he was raised in Dallas, Texas.

At an early age, Myron Butler developed an appreciation for music and, at 17, his first song, "Lift Him Up", was recorded by Dallas’ DFW Mass Choir.  While working on the recording, Butler became good friends with the choir's director Kirk Franklin.

During his last two years of high-school, Myron formed a community choir of his teen-aged peers in Dallas, but, upon graduation, he left them to pursue a degree in psychology at Morehouse College in Atlanta, Georgia.  After completing his first year, Butler decided not to return to school.  He remained in Atlanta for a year before deciding to return to Dallas, where his choir had continued to grow, in spite of changes in personnel.  The group, which had become popular in the area began calling itself God's Property and welcomed Myron as their main choral director.

Returning to Dallas allowed Myron Butler to renew his friendship with Franklin, and 
God's Property offered backup vocals for Franklin and The Family on occasional dates in and around Dallas. He would later join Franklin's group One Nation Crew for that group's short existence.

He also did a song with a Dallas based youth choir called Total Praise on their CD "Faithfulness". Butler also serves as minister of music at Oak Cliff Bible Fellowship under the direction of Dr. Tony Evans in Dallas, Tx.

He married Timberlyn Butler on July 5, 2003.

Discography

Albums
Set Me Free (with Levi)Released November 8, 2005#18 (US Gospel)
Stronger (with Levi)Released August 28, 2007
Revealed – Live in Dallas (with Levi)Released March 30, 2010
Worship Released January 24, 2012

Singles
"Set Me Free" October 25, 2005
"Stronger" July 19, 2007
"Revealed"  
"Bless the Lord" August 9, 2011
 "Let Praises Rise"  (2016)

Production credits

Filmography
Donald Lawrence Presents the Tri-City Singers Finalé DVD April 4, 2006
Stronger DVD October 2, 2007
Marvin Sapp – Thirsty DVD

Awards

References

Grammy Award winners
Living people
1974 births
Musicians from Tampa, Florida
Musicians from Dallas
Songwriters from Florida
Songwriters from Texas
Performers of Christian contemporary R&B music